Saraswati Shishu Vidya Mandir Telo is situated in Telo of district Bokaro (Jharkhand) state. This school is popularly known for its well-study education methods to the students. This is affiliated to Vidya Vikas Samiti, Jharkhand and recognized through Jharkhand Government. In this school, apart from study culture based education is given to the students. Around 800 students study here up to class 10th. This school can be reached easily by roads and trains. Telo railway station is very nearest railway station (approx 2 km. Another nearest railway station is Chandrapura (approx 6 km. The overall annual result of this school is good, which is increasing its fame day by day in whole area of Bokaro District in India.

See also
Education in India
Literacy in India
List of schools in India

References

External links

Education in Bokaro Steel City
Schools in Jharkhand